Sir Sydney Douglas Gun-Munro  (29 November 1916 – 1 March 2007) was the first Governor-General of Saint Vincent and the Grenadines from 1979 to 1985. He was educated at Grenada Boys' Secondary School where he won a scholarship, and in 1937 travelled to King's College London where he studied medicine, graduating in 1942.

References 
Biography (Government of Saint Vincent and the Grenadines, 2005)
Sir Sydney Gun-Munro passes (Government of Saint Vincent and the Grenadines, 2 March 2007)
Remembering Sir Sydney Gun-Munro (The Vincentian, 7 March 2007) (login required)
 Biography in Plarr's Lives of the Fellows Online
A History of the Grenada Boys' Secondary School

1916 births
2007 deaths
Knights Bachelor
Knights Grand Cross of the Order of St Michael and St George
Alumni of King's College London
Governors-General of Saint Vincent and the Grenadines
Fellows of the Royal College of Surgeons
Saint Vincent and the Grenadines people of Grenadian descent
Governors of British Saint Vincent and the Grenadines